Musik Josef is a Japanese manufacturer of musical instruments. It was founded by Yukio Nakamura, and is the only company in Japan specializing in producing oboes and cors anglais.

Products

Oboe
AS
BS
MGS
CGS
PGS

Cor anglais
ES1

External links

 Musik Josef website

Oboe manufacturing companies
Musical instrument manufacturing companies of Japan
Companies based in Okinawa Prefecture
Manufacturing companies established in 2007
Japanese companies established in 2007